Liam Michael Keoghan (born 29 September 1967) is an Irish former hurler. At club level he played with Tullaroan and was also a member of the Kilkenny senior hurling team. He usually lined out as a wing-back.

Career

Keoghan first came to prominence at juvenile and underage levels with the Tullaroan club before eventually joining the club's top adult team. He enjoyed his first success in 1988 when Tullaroan won the County Intermediate Championship before claiming the County Senior Championship title in 1994. Keoghan first appeared on the inter-county scene with the Kilkenny minor team in 1985 before winning a Leinster Championship title with the under-21 side in 1988. He was drafted onto the Kilkenny senior hurling team prior to the start of the 1992-93 league and was at wing-back when Kilkenny beat Galway in the 1993 All-Ireland final. Keoghan's other honours include a National League title in 1995, two Leinster Championship medals and an All-Star Award. His last major game was the 1998 All-Ireland final defeat by Offaly. His granduncle, Jack Keoghan, won five All-Ireland medals during a golden age for Kilkenny between 1907 and 1913, while his son, Martin Keoghan, has also lined out for Kilkenny.

Honours

Team

Tullaroan
Kilkenny Senior Hurling Championship: 1994
Kilkenny Intermediate  Hurling Championship: 1988

Kilkenny
All-Ireland Senior Hurling Championship: 1993
Leinster Senior Hurling Championship: 1993, 1998
National Hurling League: 1994-95
Leinster Under-21 Hurling Championship: 1988

Individual

Awards
Tullaroan Hurling Team of the Century: Right wing-back
All-Star Award: 1997

References 

1967 births
Living people
Tullaroan hurlers
Kilkenny inter-county hurlers
All-Ireland Senior Hurling Championship winners